The following are the 19 longest rivers of Norway, ranked by length:

 Glomma, 
 Pasvikelva and Ivalo,  (109 km in Norway)
 Numedalslågen, 
 Gudbrandsdalslågen and Vorma, 
 Tana, 
 Drammensvassdraget (Drammenselva, 
 Skiensvassdraget, 
 Begna, 
 Otra, 
 Trysilelva, 
 Altaelva, 
 Namsen, 
 Hallingdalselva and Snarumselva, 
 Arendalsvassdraget (Nidelva (Aust-Agder)), 
 Orklaelva, 
 Renaelva, 
 Vefsna, 
 Karasjohka, 
 Nea-Nidelvvassdraget,

Other rivers 
Other rivers include:
 Akerselva
 Eira
 Flakstadelva
 Gaula
 Tista

References 
 De lengste elvene i Norge ("The longest rivers in Norway" (Norwegian) from the Norwegian Water Resources and Energy Directorate)

Norway
 
Rivers